Within Christianity, there are a variety of views on the issues of gender identity and transgender people. Christian denominations vary in their official position: some explicitly support gender transition, some oppose it, and others are divided or have not taken an official stance. Within any given denomination, individual members may or may not endorse the official views of their church on the topic.

Denominations including the Roman Catholic Church, the Jehovah's Witnesses, and the Southern Baptist Convention have expressed official opposition to gender transition, sometimes citing Biblical references to God creating humans as "male and female." Other denominations, including the Church of England, Church of Sweden, Episcopal Church, Evangelical Lutheran Church in America, and Presbyterian Church (USA), have permitted ordained transgender clergy to serve in congregations.

In the United States, conservative Christian groups such as the Alliance Defending Freedom, the Heritage Foundation, and the Family Policy Alliance have been involved in lobbying for anti-transgender laws. In Europe, ADF has campaigned to require transgender people to undergo genital surgery and sterilization before being allowed to change their gender on identification documents. Such groups sometimes explicitly cite religious motivations for their activities; for example, the Alliance Defending Freedom has stated that it opposes transgender rights based on the idea that "God creates each person with an immutable biological sex — male or female".

History
	
The history of Christianity and homosexuality has traditionally intertwined with the history of Christianity and transgender people, and has been subject to an intense amount of debate. The Hebrew Bible and its traditional interpretations in Judaism and Christianity have historically affirmed and endorsed a patriarchal and heteronormative approach towards human sexuality. They favour exclusively penetrative vaginal intercourse between men and women within the boundaries of marriage over all other forms of human sexual activity. This includes autoeroticism, masturbation, oral sex, non-penetrative and non-heterosexual sexual intercourse (all of which have been labeled as "sodomy" at various times). They believe and teach that such behaviors are forbidden because they're considered sinful, and further compared to or derived from the behavior of the alleged residents of Sodom and Gomorrah. However, the status of LGBT people in early Christianity is debated.
	
	
Some Catholic commentators and commentators of other denominations maintain that the early Christian churches deplored transgender people and same-sex relationships. However, others maintain that they accepted them on the level of their heterosexual counterparts. These disagreements concern, the translations of certain terms, or the meaning and context of some biblical passages, including Sodom and Gamorrah, Levitical laws, and other passages.

Roman Catholic Church

The Catechism of the Roman Catholic Church does not have any text explicitly regarding transgender people. However, it does clearly state that gender is exclusively binary and every person should "acknowledge and accept his sexual identity." It strongly implies that birth anatomy and gender expression are equal and further emphasizes binary heterosexual marriage and family roles.

In December 2012, during his Christmas address to the Roman Curia, Pope Benedict XVI described the view that one can choose their gender identity, as a "profound falsehood."

In 2015, Pope Francis criticized "gender ideology" on multiple occasions. In a book published in January 2015, with content taken from an October 2014 interview with the pontiff, Francis stated,

In March, he said that,

In April, Francis said, 

In September 2015, the Vatican declared that transgender Catholics cannot become godparents. This was in response to a transgender man's query that transgender status "reveals in a public way an attitude opposite to the moral imperative of solving the problem of sexual identity according to the truth of one's own sexuality" and that, "[t]herefore it is evident that this person does not possess the requirement of leading a life according to the faith and in the position of godfather and is therefore unable to be admitted to the position of godfather or godmother."

Pope Francis criticized schools in 2016 for teaching children that they can choose their gender. Referring to it as a form of ideological "colonization".

In June 2019, the Catholic Church published a document titled Male and Female He Created Them, which summarized its official position. The document rejected the terms transgender and intersex, and criticized the idea that people could choose or change their gender. They labeled it as a "confused concept of freedom" and "momentary desires". It asserted male and female genitalia were designed for procreation. Transgender advocates responded that people may discover a gender different than their external appearance, as determined by "genetics, hormones, and brain chemistry". They criticized the document as not reflecting the life experiences of transgender people and worried it would encourage discrimination and self-harm.

In January 2020, Bishop Paprocki of the Diocese of Springfield released a pastoral guide regarding gender identity. Paprocki's guide stated that "a person cannot change his or her gender" and that sex-reassignment surgery is "a type of mutilation and intrinsically evil." He also refers to transgender surgeries for children as "child abuse and genital mutilation" and emphasized that "it is imperative to be clear on the reality of human biology as a gift from God that we cannot change."

In August 2021, Bishop Burbidge of the Diocese of Arlington released a pastoral letter titled A Catechesis on the Human Person and Gender Ideology. Burbidge's letter calls upon Catholics to show love to transgender people, reminding them of their value and listening to their struggle, while also avoiding showing any "misguided charity and false compassion." He urges Catholics to reject the use of "gender-affirming' terms or pronouns", as it would "be inconsistent" with Church teachings on sex.

Pope Francis has met with transgender people during the COVID-19 Pandemic to offer medical care.

Mainline Protestantism 
Within mainline and liberal Protestantism, several denominations including regional bodies within denominations have grown increasingly accepting and supportive of transgender members and rights. Usually, support for the full inclusion of transgender people, including in ordained ministry, has been accompanied by support for the broader LGBT community. In 2000, the Church of England, an Anglican church, permitted transgender priests to continue serving as pastors. In 2006, the Church of Sweden, the national Lutheran church, voted to ordain transgender priests. In 2008, the United Methodist Church determined that transgender people could serve as ordained pastors within the denomination. In 2009, a spokesperson for the Church in Wales, an Anglican church, announced that the church affirms transgender people. In 2014, the Calvary Baptist Church in DC ordained the first known and openly transgender minister within a Baptist church. Calvary Baptist is affiliated with the American Baptist Churches USA, Cooperative Baptist Fellowship, and Alliance of Baptists.

In 2014, the Anglican church appointed an openly transgender, and lesbian, vicar as a minor canon in Manchester Cathedral. In 2015, the Church of England introduced a proposal to offer naming ceremonies for transgender members. The Diocese of Blackburn in the Church of England has already been using the naming rite. The Secretary General of the Archbishop's Council of the Church of England William "Nye said the Church already had services for people who had been through a 'significant personal transition of one kind or another' which could be used to mark gender change." Couples, where one partner is transgender and recognized as having legally transitioned, may marry in Church of England parishes. "Thus clergy in the Church of England...will not be able to prohibit the use of their church buildings for such marriages." In 2017, the General Synod of the Church of England passed a motion stating, "That this Synod, recognizing the need for transgender people to be welcomed and affirmed in their parish church, call on the House of Bishops to consider whether some nationally commended liturgical materials might be prepared to mark a person's gender transition."

In 2017, M Barclay became the first openly non-binary trans person to be commissioned as a Deacon in the United Methodist Church.

Other denominations that welcome transgender members and ordain transgender people in ministry are the Episcopal Church, United Church of Christ, Evangelical Lutheran Church in America, and the Presbyterian Church (USA).

Transgender people have also gained acceptance in some churches in Africa and Asia. In 2012, the Church of South India opened up the possibility of ordaining transgender priests. In Africa, the Anglican Church of Southern Africa affirmed that transgender people could be "full members".

The Mar Thoma Syrian Church is a Reformed Orthodox denomination in India which is a full communion partner of the Anglican Communion. The Mar Thoma Church has affirmed societal support for the inclusion and acceptance of third gender persons. In 2019, the church announced that it supports transgender people and that it believes the Bible makes several references to transgender people. The church also started a program to provide financial assistance to transgender persons in need of sex reassignment surgery.

Old Catholic Church
The Old Catholic Church has been affirming and welcoming to transgender members. Old Catholic and Independent Catholic churches have been accepting of the LGBT community in general. In 2014, one of the first transgender priests was ordained in the Old Catholic Church.

Unitarianism 
The Unitarian Universalist Association (UUA), a mainline and historically Christian Non-Trinitarian denomination, has been supportive of transgender people. Although they are no longer exclusively Christian, they officially welcome transgender members and ministers. In 2017, the Unitarian Universalist Association's General Assembly voted to create inclusive wordings for non-binary, genderqueer, gender fluid, agender, intersex, two-spirit, and polygender people. They've progressively replaced the words "men and women" with the word "people". Of the six sources of the living tradition, the second source of faith, as documented in the bylaws of the denomination, now includes "Words and deeds of prophetic people which challenge us to confront powers and structures of evil with justice, compassion, and the transforming power of love".

Jehovah's Witnesses 
The Jehovah's Witnesses view gender-affirming hormones and surgeries as mutilation, where "the ultimate result is either a severely (and irreversibly) mutilated man who resembles a woman, or a severely (and irreversibly) mutilated woman who resembles a man." Transitioning is believed to be "contrary to nature".

Philippine Independent Church
Officially known as the Iglesia Filipina Independiente and colloquially called the Aglipayan Church, an Independent Catholic and Anglo-Catholic denomination, the church has adopted an official and binding position of inclusion and full acceptance of LGBT individuals and organizations since 2017 after the question of inclusiveness was raised in an official leadership meeting by a gay member of the church in 2014. Its youth organization wing has also repeatedly elected presidents, vice presidents, and executives who belong to the Filipino LGBT youth sector. On February 24, 2023, the church ordained Wylard "Wowa" Ledama, a transwoman, to the diaconate as the church's first trans clergy in the predominantly conservative country.

Specific topics

Sex reassignment surgery, castration, and other gender-related body modification 
In the Old Testament, men with damaged testicles or severed genitals are forbidden from being admitted to religious assemblies.

The New Testament is more ambiguous about gender-variant identities than the Old Testament. Eunuchs (Greek eunochos, similar to Hebrew saris) are indicated as acceptable candidates for evangelism and baptism, as demonstrated in a story about the conversion of an Ethiopian eunuch. While answering questions about marriage and divorce, Jesus says that "there are eunuchs who have been so from birth, and there are eunuchs who have been made eunuchs by others, and there are eunuchs who have made themselves eunuchs for the sake of the kingdom of heaven." This has sparked discussion about the significance of the selection of the Ethiopian eunuch as being the first Gentile convert to Christianity. Some argue that the inclusion of a eunuch represents a sexual minority similar to some of those who are included under today's category of transgender, in the context of the time.

Modern Christian denominations vary in their views, but some are accepting. Unitarian Universalism is a liberal religion with roots in liberal Christianity. Unitarian Universalism was the first denomination to accept openly transgender people as full members with eligibility to become clergy. They were the first to open an Office of Bisexual, Gay, Lesbian, and Transgender Concerns. In 1988 the first openly transgender person was ordained by the Unitarian Universalist Association. In 2002 Rev. Sean Dennison became the first openly transgender person in the Unitarian Universalist ministry called to serve a congregation; he was called to South Valley UU Society, Salt Lake City, UT. The United Church of Christ General Synod called for full inclusion of transgender persons in 2003. In 2005 Sarah Jones became the first openly transgender person ordained by the Church of England as a priest. Carol Stone was the first transgender priest, having been ordained in 1978 and transitioning in 2000, then continuing her ministry within the church as a woman. In 2008, the United Methodist Church Judicial Council ruled that transgender pastor Drew Phoenix could keep his position. At the UMC General Conference the same year, several petitions that would have forbidden transgender clergy and added anti-transgender language to the Book of Discipline were rejected. In 2012 the Episcopal Church in the United States approved a change to their nondiscrimination canons to include gender identity and expression. In 2013 Shannon Kearns became the first openly transgender person ordained by the North American Old Catholic Church. In 2014 Megan Rohrer became the first openly transgender leader of a Lutheran congregation (specifically, the Grace Evangelical Lutheran Church of San Francisco).

Gender identity 
A number of Christian denominations do not recognize gender transition. A 2000 document from the Catholic Congregation for the Doctrine of the Faith concludes that sex reassignment procedures do not change a person's gender in the eyes of the Church. "The key point," said the reported document, "is that the transsexual surgical operation is so superficial and external that it does not change the personality. If the person was a male, he remains male. If she was female, she remains female." The document also concludes that a "sex-change" operation could be morally acceptable in certain extreme cases, but that in all cases transgender people cannot validly marry. Pope Benedict XVI has denounced gender theory, warning that it blurs the distinction between male and female and could thus lead to the "self-destruction" of the human species. He warned against alteration of the term "gender": "What is often expressed and understood by the term 'gender,' is definitively resolved in the self-emancipation of the human being from creation and the Creator," he warned. "Man wants to create himself, and to decide always and exclusively on his own about what concerns him." The Pontiff said this is humanity living "against truth, against the creating Spirit."

In 2006 Albert Mohler, then president of the Southern Baptist Theological Seminary, said "Only God has the right to determine gender", adding, "any
attempt to alter that creation is an act of rebellion against God." He also stated,

In 2014, the Southern Baptist Convention approved a resolution at its annual meeting stating that "God's design was the creation of two distinct and complementary sexes, male and female" and that "gender identity is determined by biological sex, not by one's self-perception." Furthermore, the resolution opposes hormone therapy, transition-related procedures, and anything else that would "alter one's bodily identity". The resolution further opposes government efforts to "validate transgender identity as morally praiseworthy". Instead, the resolution asks transgender people to "trust in Christ and to experience renewal in the Gospel".

On August 29, 2017, the Council on Biblical Manhood and Womanhood released a manifesto on human sexuality known as the "Nashville Statement". The statement was signed by 150 evangelical leaders, and includes 14 points of belief.

Cross-gender clothing 

The idea of "cross-dressing" as a sin is addressed generally, both related to and unrelated to transgender issues. Some denominations do not recognize transgender identities and thus consider transitioned individuals to be cross-dressing. Notably, cross-dressing is a behavior and being transgender is identifying as a gender different than you are born as.

The Torah contains prohibitions against men wearing women's clothing and vice versa, which is cited as an abomination in Deuteronomy 22:5,. As a result, it was once considered taboo in Western society for women to wear clothing traditionally associated with men, except in certain circumstances such as cases of necessity (as per St. Thomas Aquinas's guidelines in the Summa Theologica). In the Middle Ages, this rule's applicability was occasionally disputed. The Quinisext Council in the 7th century ordered students at the University of Constantinople to stop engaging in transvestism.

Bible scholar Adam Clarke said in his commentary, "it is very probable that armour is here intended" referring to Deuteronomy 22:5.

However, there are arguments about whether Jesus abolished the Torah law about clothing. Jesus mentioned "Do not worry about clothes" in Matthew 6:25, Matthew 6:28, and Luke 12:22.

Denominations that allow transgender clergy 

 Alliance of Baptists
 American Baptist Churches USA
 Anglican Church of Australia
 Anglican Church of Canada
 Anglican Church of Southern Africa
 Baptist World Alliance
 Christian Church (Disciples of Christ)
 Church in Wales
 Church of Denmark
 Church of England
 Church of Norway
 Church of South India
 Church of Sweden
 Cooperative Baptist Fellowship
 Episcopal Church
 Evangelical Lutheran Church in America
 Evangelical Lutheran Church in Canada
 Evangelical Church in Germany
 Evangelical Church of India
 Evangelical Lutheran Church of Finland
Mar Thoma Syrian Church
 Methodist Church of Great Britain
 Methodist Church of New Zealand
 Old Catholic Church
 Presbyterian Church (USA)
 Unitarian and Free Christian Churches
 Unitarian Universalist Association
 Uniting Church in Australia
 United Church of Canada
 United Church of Christ
 United Methodist Church
Uniting Reformed Church in Southern Africa (Southern Synod)
 Scottish Episcopal Church

References

 
Christian ethics
Transgender topics and religion